Frontier (foaled 1896) was a British Thoroughbred racehorse who won the Dewhurst Plate as a two-year-old and the Ascot Derby as a three-year-old. He was owned by the Hugh Grosvenor, 1st Duke of Westminster and trained by John Porter at Kingsclere.

Background
Frontier was a chestnut colt bred by the 1st Duke of Westminster and foaled in 1896. He was the son of dual Eclipse Stakes winner Orme, who was Champion sire in Britain in 1899. Amongst Orme's other progeny were Triple Crown winner Flying Fox, Derby winner Orby and 1000 Guineas winner Witch Elm. Frontier's dam was Quetta, a daughter of Bend Or who also produced the City and Suburban Handicap winner Grey Leg and Coronation Stakes winner Helm.

Racing career
As a two-year-old Frontier ran in the National Breeders' Produce Stakes over five furlongs at Sandown. Ridden by Morny Cannon he finished unplaced. He started at the odds of 100/15 for the Dewhurst Plate, again being ridden by Morny Cannon. After the start Frontier was on his own of the far side of the track and as the horses neared the finish he and Caiman, the 11/8 favourite, came away from the field. At the finish Frontier just held on to win by a head from Caiman, with the two clear of Vara in third place.

As a three-year-old at Royal Ascot Frontier ran in the Ascot Derby Stakes. Starting the 6/4 favourite, Cannon sent him to the front as the field of six entered the finishing straight. Non of his rivals could catch him and he went on to win by ¾ length from Jolly Tar. In the Eclipse Stakes at Sandown he faced 2000 Guineas and Epsom Derby winner Flying Fox, who started as the 14/100 favourite. Frontier himself started at 66/1 and finished in second place, a length behind Flying Fox.

Pedigree

Note: b. = Bay, br. = Brown, ch. = Chestnut

* Frontier was inbred 2x3 to Bend Or. This means that the stallion appears once in the second generation and once in the third generation of his pedigree.

References

1896 racehorse births
Racehorses bred in the United Kingdom
Racehorses trained in the United Kingdom
Thoroughbred family 6-e